Theodora "Dido" Mary Hill (later Gotz; born 11 January 1946) is a New Zealand Olympic gymnast.

Life
Hill was born in 1946 in Hawera, Taranaki, New Zealand. She won her first women's national championship in 1963 and in total, she was national champion five times.

Hill represented her country at the 1964 Summer Olympics in Tokyo, Japan, in gymnastics. In the vault, she came 72nd. In the floor exercise, she was 68th. On the uneven bars, she came 77th. On the balance beam, she was 70th. In the Women's individual all-around, she was ranked 75th of 86 competitors. She is listed as New Zealand Olympic competitor number 180. She represented New Zealand at a number of World Gymnastics Championships.

Later in life, Gotz worked as a coach and judged gymnastics competitions. She remains active in gymnastics herself and by 2013, she had competed in four World Masters Games. She was present in May 2016 when the New Zealand Olympic Committee announced the three gymnasts that were to represent the country at the 2016 Summer Olympics. Hill was a judge at the mid-island gymnastics champs in Gisborne in June 2017. In May 2017, she was made a life member of Gymnastics New Zealand.

Gotz lives in Auckland. She is known in gymnastics circles as Dido.

References

External links
Photo of Hill from the 1964 gymnastic championships held in Nelson

Living people
Sportspeople from Hāwera
1946 births
Olympic gymnasts of New Zealand
Gymnasts at the 1964 Summer Olympics
New Zealand female artistic gymnasts
20th-century New Zealand women